Men's State Prison was a Georgia Department of Corrections prison for men in Milledgeville, Georgia, near Hardwick.  The facility closed in 2011.

References

External links

 "Men's State Prison." Georgia Department of Corrections.

Defunct prisons in Georgia (U.S. state)
Buildings and structures in Baldwin County, Georgia
Men's prisons
Men in the United States
1950 establishments in Georgia (U.S. state)
2011 disestablishments in Georgia (U.S. state)